Streeters Corners is a hamlet in the town of Cambria in Niagara County, New York, United States. Elton Streeter settled in Cambria (1897) and built a blacksmith shop at the junction of Rt 104 and Lockport-Wilson Road Streeter appear in the "History of Cambria, New York" included in William Pool, ed. Landmarks of Niagara County, New York (Syracuse, 1897).

References

Hamlets in New York (state)
Hamlets in Niagara County, New York